Tropidophorus baconi, also known commonly as Bacon's water skink or Bacon's waterside skink,  is a species of lizard in the subfamily Sphenomorphinae of the family Scincidae. The species is endemic to Sulawesi (Indonesia).

Etymology
The specific name, baconi, is in honor of American herpetologist James Patterson Bacon, Jr. (1940–1986).

Reproduction
T. baconi is viviparous.

References

Further reading
Hikida T, Riyanto A, Ota H (2003). "A New Water Skink of the Genus Tropidophorus (Lacertilia: Scincidae) from Sulawesi, Indonesia". Current Herpetology 22 (1): 29–36. (Tropdophorus baconi, new species).
Honda M, Ota H, Murphy RW, Hikida T (2006). "Phylogeny and biogeography of water skinks of the genus Tropidophorus (Reptilia: Scincidae): a molecular approach". Zoologica Scripta 35 (1): 85–95.
Koch A (2012). Discovery, Diversity, and Distribution of the Amphibians and Reptiles of Sulawesi and its offshore Islands. Frankfurt am Main: Chimaira. 374 pp. .

baconi
Endemic fauna of Indonesia
Reptiles of Sulawesi
Reptiles described in 2003